Babu Nanthankode  is a South Indian film director who works mainly in the Malayalam film industry. Born in Thiruvananthapuram, India, Babu Nanthankode displayed a storyteller's potential from an early age. He is known for his realistic and sensitive portrayal of village life in his movies.

Filmography
Swapnam (1973)
Youvanam (1974)
Bhaarya Illaatha Raathri (1975)
Sathyathinte Nizhalil (1975)
Maanasaveena (1976)
Karnaparvam (1977)
Ahalya (1978)

External links
 

Year of birth missing (living people)
Living people
Film directors from Thiruvananthapuram
Malayalam film directors
20th-century Indian film directors